This article refers to the insect genus; for the Roman mythological figure, see Fulgora (mythology)

The fulgorid genus Fulgora contains several large Central and South American planthoppers known by a large variety of common names including lantern fly, peanut bug, peanut-headed lanternfly, alligator bug, machaca, and jequitiranaboia (the latter terms used in the Amazon region and elsewhere in Brazil). The nine species are mostly similar in appearance, with differences in the shape of the head (often quite subtle), and patterns of wing coloration. The most well-known and widespread of these species is Fulgora laternaria. They can measure as long as 3 inches. There is some confusion regarding the validity of some of the currently recognised species. The type species of Fulgora is Cicada laternaria Linnaeus  1758, designated under the Plenary Powers by ICZN (1954: 185). Old World species assigned to this genus belong instead to the genus Pyrops.

Gallery

References

External links

Fulgorinae
Auchenorrhyncha genera
Hemiptera of Central America
Hemiptera of South America